Ahsan is a male name in Urdu and Persian, coming from the Arabic triconsonantal root Ḥ-S-N, also as the diminutive of Hassan.

Given name

 Ahsan Ayaz (born 1998), Pakistani squash player
 Ahsan Iqbal, Pakistani politician
 Ahsan Khan (actor), Pakistani actor
 Ahsan Malik, Pakistani commander
 Ahsan Raza, Pakistani first class cricketer
 Ahsan Watts, teenage soul and R&B singer from Newark, New Jersey
 Ahsanullah Khan Bahadur, nawab of Dhaka
 Ahsan Ali (disambiguation)

Surname
 Aitzaz Ahsan, Pakistani barrister and politician
 Haseeb Ahsan, Pakistani first class cricketer
 Jaya Ahsan, Bangladeshi actress and producer
 Jeetu Ahsan, Bangladeshi actor
 Riaz Ahsan, Pakistani statistician and mathematician
 Saleyha Ahsan, British medical doctor, presenter and journalist
 Syed Mohammad Ahsan, Pakistan Navy admiral and politician

Masculine given names
Arabic-language surnames
Arabic masculine given names